James MacPherson (born September 2, 1980) is a former American football quarterback who played two seasons in the Arena Football League (AFL) with the Georgia Force and Grand Rapids Rampage. He played college football at Wake Forest University. He was also a member of the Indianapolis Colts, Hamilton Tiger-Cats, Colorado Crush, Philadelphia Soul and Green Bay Blizzard.

Early years
MacPherson played high school football at Mountain View High School in Tucson, Arizona, where he was a three-year letterman at quarterback. He also earned All-Southern Arizona honors as both a quarterback and punter in 1997. MacPherson recorded 2,500 passing yards and 800 rushing yards during his career. He completed more than 56 percent of his passes. He earned all-region honors as a shortstop and pitcher in baseball. MacPherson also earned a spot on the honor roll and was named a "Scholar-Athlete" by the Arizona Interscholastic Association.

College career
MacPherson played for the Wake Forest Demon Deacons of Wake Forest University from 1999 to 2002. He was redshirted in 1998. He recorded 16 touchdowns on 4,716 passing yards for the Demon Deacons. MacPherson earned MVP honors in the 2002 Seattle Bowl. He was also named to the Academic All-ACC Team as a senior and finished his career ranked No. 7 all-time in school history for passing yards. He also occasionally served as the team's punter during his college career.

Statistics

Source:

Professional career

Indianapolis Colts
MacPherson spent the 2003 off-season with the Indianapolis Colts of the National Football League (NFL) after going undrafted in the 2003 NFL Draft. He played in all four preseason games and was released by the team on August 31, 2003.

Hamilton Tiger-Cats
He signed with the Hamilton Tiger-Cats of the Canadian Football League in March 2004 and was released by the Tiger-Cats on June 9, 2004.

Colorado Crush
MacPherson was signed by the Colorado Crush of the Arena Football League (AFL) on January 6, 2005 and released by the team on January 20, 2005.

Philadelphia Soul
He signed with the Philadelphia Soul of the AFL on January 12, 2006 and was released on January 20, 2006.

Green Bay Blizzard
He played for the Green Bay Blizzard of the af2 in 2006, recording 36 touchdowns on 2,241 passing yards as the Blizzard advanced to ArenaCup VII.

Georgia Force
MacPherson played for the Georgia Force of the AFL in 2007 and was the backup to Chris Greisen.

Grand Rapids Rampage
James signed with the Grand Rapids Rampage of the AFL on October 31, 2007. He recorded 88 touchdowns on 4,011 passing yards while also scoring eight rushing touchdowns for the Rampage in 2007.

AFL statistics

Stats from ArenaFan:

Coaching career

Mountain View High School
MacPherson was a coach for the Mountain View Mountain Lions of Mountain View High School from 2003 to 2004.

Tortolita Junior High School
He coached at Tortolita Junior High School in 2006.

Mountain View High School (second stint)
He was a coach for the Mountain View Mountain Lions in 2008.

Pima CC
MacPherson was quarterbacks and offensive quality control coach for the Pima Aztecs of Pima Community College in 2009.

Florida Tuskers
He served as offensive quality control coach for the Florida Tuskers of the United Football League (UFL) in 2010.

Sacramento Mountain Lions
He was running backs coach of the Sacramento Mountain Lions of the UFL from 2011 to 2012.

Pime CC (second stint)
MacPherson returned as quarterbacks coach of the Pima Aztecs in 2013.

Scouting career
MacPherson was hired as a college scout for the San Diego Chargers in May 2014.

References

External links
Just Sports Stats
College stats

Living people
1980 births
American football quarterbacks
American football punters
Canadian football quarterbacks
American players of Canadian football
Wake Forest Demon Deacons football players
Green Bay Blizzard players
Georgia Force players
Grand Rapids Rampage players
Indianapolis Colts players
Hamilton Tiger-Cats players
Colorado Crush players
Philadelphia Soul players
High school football coaches in Arizona
Pima Aztecs football coaches
Florida Tuskers coaches
Sacramento Mountain Lions coaches
San Diego Chargers scouts
Players of American football from Tucson, Arizona